Shooting at the 2013 Games of the Small States of Europe was held from 28–31 May 2013 at Differdange and Limpertsberg, Luxembourg.

Medal summary

Medal table

Men

Women

References

External links
Site of the 2013 Games of the Small States of Europe
Result book

2013 in shooting sports
2013 Games of the Small States of Europe
Shooting at the Games of the Small States of Europe